GimPhoto is a modification of the free and open source graphics program GNU Image Manipulation Program (GIMP), with the intent to be a free replacement to Adobe Photoshop.
It has a new menu layout, new brushes and gradient sets. Its primary purpose is to enhance GIMP in terms of user interface, use of the best plugins and other resources combined with the latest stable version of GIMP. Because the menu layouts are much closer to Photoshop's, adaptation from Photoshop is much quicker than GIMP.

Version 24.1 for Windows is with new installer for Windows 8.1 including 7 and new 10.

Version 26.1 for Mac OS X 10.6+ is also available. It is based on GIMP 2.6.8 and needs X11.

Future development 
Since GimPhoto is a one-man effort, the developer has chosen to look for a long lasting, stable release of GIMP, before creating a new version of GimPhoto.

See also 

 GIMP
 Adobe Photoshop
 Comparison of raster graphics editors
 Seashore
 GIMPshop

References

Free raster graphics editors
Raster graphics editors for Linux
Technical communication tools
Graphics software that uses GTK